The African-American Film Critics Association Awards 2007, honoring the best in filmmaking of 2007, were given on December 17, 2007.

Top 10 Films
 The Great Debaters
 American Gangster
 Talk to Me
 Gone Baby Gone
 No Country for Old Men
 Michael Clayton
 Juno
 Sweeney Todd: The Demon Barber of Fleet Street
 Things We Lost in the Fire
 There Will Be Blood

Winners
Best Actor:
Don Cheadle – Talk to Me
Best Actress:
Marion Cotillard – La Vie en rose
Best Director:
Kasi Lemmons – Talk to Me
Best Picture:
The Great Debaters
Best Supporting Actor:
Chiwetel Ejiofor – Talk to Me
Best Supporting Actress:
Ruby Dee – American Gangster

References
http://www.blackfilm.com/20071214/features/aafca.shtml

2007 film awards
African-American Film Critics Association Awards